Kim Gruenenfelder is an American author and screenwriter. She became known for writing women's fiction, specifically romantic comedy fiction, novels.

Her debut novel, A Total Waste of Makeup, has been published in six languages and eight international editions to date, and is followed by a sequel, Misery Loves Cabernet. Her next series began in 2010 with There's Cake in My Future, which was followed in 2013 by Keep Calm and Carry a Big Drink. Her fifth published novel, Love The Wine You're With, which details the adventures of a group of friends who open a wine bar, was released June 13, 2017. Her next novel Hangovers and Hot Flashes, released in December 2018, follows the lives of protagonists in their forties. Her latest novel is 2020's My Ex's Wedding.

In addition to her published novels, she has written screenplays, a stage play, and was also a writer for the television show Jeopardy!. In 2016, she created the word "Eciah", which refers to a moment in your life when your future gets a lot brighter.

Early life 
Gruenenfelder was born in St. Louis, Missouri. Her father was Edmond Jacques Gruenenfelder III, a salesman. Her mother was Carol Campbell, a writer. Gruenenfelder moved to Southern California with her family when she was seven years old. She graduated from Fountain Valley High School at age sixteen.

At age 16, Gruenenfelder began attending the University of California, Los Angeles. At age 20, Gruenenfelder graduated with a B.A. in history, specializing in women's history, from UCLA.

Career

Entertainment 
Gruenenfelder's career in the entertainment industry started at the age of nineteen when she became a production assistant on the show Jeopardy!. She became a researcher on the show at twenty, and went on to become a screenwriter.

Novels 
Gruenenfelder's first published novel was A Total Waste of Makeup, followed up by Misery Loves Cabernet. These are part of the Charlize series, focusing on a character named Charlize Edwards who starts the series by turning thirty. Depicting life in Hollywood and the entertainment industry, it includes characters like eccentric actor Drew Stanton.

Gruenenfelder then started a series about a cake pull, with There's Cake in My Future and then Keep Calm and Carry a Big Drink. These were her first novels focusing on three central characters per book, a trend she has continued.

Her fifth published novel, different from the others in terms of series, is Love The Wine You're With, detailing the adventures of a group of friends who open a wine bar in Echo Park.

Deciding not to have a second book in the wine bar series, she moved on to a series about characters in their forties. Describing that publishers continuously told her nobody would read books about characters in their forties, she went forward with the book anyway. In December 2018, Gruenenfelder released Hangovers and Hot Flashes.

In 2016, Gruenenfelder coined the term "eciah".  She defines it as "moment in your life when your future suddenly gets a lot brighter", according to her website eciah.com. She is the curator for this website, founding and creating it. Her personal eciah was when she found out she was pregnant with her first and only child.

Audiobooks 
As Kim Gruenenfelder Smith, she directed the audiobook for Nicholas Kristof and Sheryl WuDunn's Tightrope: Americans Reaching for Hope, which was narrated by Jennifer Garner.

Politics 
In January 2018, Gruenenfelder announced a campaign for the United States House of Representatives, to represent California's 28th congressional district. A member of the Democratic Party, Gruenenfelder challenged incumbent Adam Schiff on a platform that included single-payer healthcare, opposition to foreign wars, and the creation of a Federal Ballot Initiative to nationally allow for proposition-based direct democracy. She also expressed support for gun control, climate change mitigation, DACA, and public charter schools. On March 3, Gruenenfelder officially withdrew from the race.

Gruenenfelder endorsed Barack Obama in 2008 and 2012, and fundraised for his campaign. Gruenenfelder endorsed Seth Moulton in the 2020 Democratic primary. A supporter of Black Lives Matter, Gruenenfelder participated in protests in Los Angeles after the murder of George Floyd.

Bibliography
 A Total Waste of Makeup, St. Martin's Press, 2005
 Misery Loves Cabernet, St. Martin's Press, 2009
 There's Cake in My Future, St. Martin's Press, 2010
 Keep Calm and Carry a Big Drink, St. Martin's Press, 2013
 Love The Wine You're With, St. Martin's Press, 2017
 Hangovers & Hot Flashes, Geoghegan & Burke Publishing, 2018
 My Ex's Wedding, Geoghegan & Burke Publishing, 2020

Personal life 
Gruenenfelder's husband is Brian Smith, writer and director. They have one son, Alex. Gruenenfelder lives in Los Angeles, California.

See also

 Women's fiction
 Romantic comedy

References

External links
 
 Kim Gruenefelder on Ballotpedia
 Kim Gruenenfelder Official website
 Kim Gruenenfelder at Macmillan.com
 Kim Gruenenfelder at Goodreads.com

American women novelists
American chick lit writers
Living people
21st-century American novelists
21st-century American women writers
Writers from St. Louis
Novelists from Missouri
1967 births